The 1935 Spanish Grand Prix was a Grand Prix motor race held at Lasarte on 22 September 1935.

Classification

Notes
 Paul Pietsch took over from Achille Varzi after the latter's face was cut due to a stone smashing his windscreen. After treatment, Varzi took the car back but gave it back to Pietsch after it developed a gearbox problem.

Spanish Grand Prix
Spanish Grand Prix
Grand Prix